Bedales School is a co-educational private school (boarding and day) in the village of Steep, near the market town of Petersfield in Hampshire, England. It was founded in 1893 by John Haden Badley in reaction to the limitations of conventional Victorian schools and has been co-educational since 1898.

Since 1900 the school has been on an  estate in the village of Steep, near Petersfield, Hampshire. As well as playing fields, orchards, woodland, pasture and a nature reserve, the campus also has two Grade I listed arts and crafts buildings designed by Ernest Gimson, the Lupton Hall (1911), which was co-designed, built and largely financed by ex-pupil Geoffrey Lupton, and  the Memorial Library (1921). There are also three contemporary award-winning buildings: the Olivier Theatre (1997) designed by Feilden Clegg Bradley Studios, the Orchard Building (2005) by Walters & Cohen and the Art and Design Building (2017) also by Feilden Clegg Bradley Studios.

History

The school was started in 1893 by John H Badley and Oswald B Powell after they had been introduced to each other by Goldsworthy Lowes Dickinson, whom they both knew from their Cambridge days. Their wives, Amy Badley and Winifred Powell, were an essential part of the team. A house called Bedales was rented just outside Lindfield, near Haywards Heath. In 1899 Badley and Powell (the latter borrowing heavily from his father, the Vicar of Bisham) purchased a country estate near Steep and constructed a purpose-built school, including state-of-the-art electric lighting, which opened in 1900. The site has been extensively developed over the past century, including the relocation of a number of historic vernacular timber frame barns. A preparatory school, Dunhurst, was started in 1902 on Montessori principles (and was visited in 1919 by Dr Montessori herself), and a primary school, Dunannie, was added in the 1950s.

Badley took a non-denominational approach to religion and the school has never had a chapel: its relatively secular teaching made it attractive in its early days to non-conformists, agnostics, Quakers, Unitarians and liberal Jews, who formed a significant element of its early intake. The school was also well known and popular in some Cambridge and Fabian intellectual circles with connections to the Wedgwoods, Darwins, Huxleys, and Trevelyans. Books such as A quoi tient la supériorité des Anglo-Saxons? and L'Education nouvelle popularised the school on the Continent, leading to a cosmopolitan intake of Russian and other European children in the 1920s.

Bedales was originally a small and intimate school: the 1900 buildings were designed for 150 pupils. Under a programme of expansion and modernisation in the 1960s and 1970s under the headmastership of Tim Slack, the senior school grew from 240 pupils in 1966 to 340, thereafter increasing to some 465.

Heads

 1893–1935 John Haden Badley
 1936–1946 Frederic Alfred Meier
 1946–1962 Hector Beaumont Jacks
 1962–1974 Tim Slack
 1974–1981 Patrick Nobes
 1981–1992 Euan MacAlpine
 1992–1994 Ian Newton
 1994–2001 Alison Willcocks
 2001–2018 Keith Budge
 2018–2021 Magnus Bashaarat
 2021–present Will Goldsmith

Old Bedalians

Ben Adams (born 1981), singer/songwriter
Margaret Allan (1909–1998), racing driver and journalist
Lily Allen (born 1985), singer
Marjory Allen, Lady Allen of Hurtwood (1897–1976), landscape architect and child welfare promoter
Kirstie Allsopp (born 1971), TV presenter
 Simon Anholt (born c.1961), independent policy advisor, author and researcher; pioneer of the concept of 'nation branding'
Diana Armfield RA (born 1920), artist and Royal Academician
David Armstrong-Jones, 2nd Earl of Snowdon (born 1961), cabinet-maker, son of Princess Margaret
Tom Arnold (born 1947), politician
Grace Barnsley (1896–1975), pottery decorator
Jacques Benoist-Méchin (1901–1983), French intellectual, writer, political figure
Ferenc Békássy (1893–1915), Hungarian poet
Hugh Hale Bellot FRHS (1890–1969), Professor of American History and Vice-Chancellor of the University of London (1951–53)
 Sebastian Bergne (born 1966), industrial designer
 Robert Dudley Best (1892–1984), lighting designer, manufacturer, author
Dame Helen Blaxland (1907–1989), writer
Remy Blumenfeld (born 1965), TV producer and entrepreneur
Stephen Bone (1904–1958), artist
Sadie Bonnell (1888–1993), World War I First Aid Nursing Yeomanry ambulance driver
Jocelyn Brooke (1908-1966), author and amateur botanist
Michael Harris Caine (1927–1999), businessman
Jamie Campbell Bower (born 1988), actor, singer 
Gyles Brandreth (born 1948), journalist, television presenter and former Conservative MP (City of Chester)
William Bridges-Adams (1889–1965), theatre director, and Director
Jocelyn Brooke (1908–1966), writer and naturalist
Jeremy Browne (born 1970), Liberal Democrat MP for Taunton Deane
Lois Bulley (1901 - 1995), British county councillor, philanthropist and political activist
Selina Cadell (born 1953), actress
Simon Cadell (1950–1996), actor
Vice-Admiral Alfred Carpenter (1881–1955), World War I Victoria Cross recipient
Charles Cecil, (born 1962), videogame designer
Pat Chapman (born 1940), founder of The Curry Club, author and broadcaster
Clancy Chassay, journalist
Lady Sarah Chatto (born 1964), daughter of Princess Margaret
Ruth Collet (1909–2001), artist
Sir Laurence Collier (1890–1976), Ambassador to Norway, 1939–1950
Tom Conway (1904–1967), actor
Esmé Creed-Miles (born 2000), actress
Sophie Dahl (born 1977), model, author and chef
Henry Danowski (born 1984), musician
Daniel Day-Lewis (born 1957), Oscar-winning actor
Tamasin Day-Lewis (born 1953)
Cara Delevingne (born 1992), model
Poppy Delevingne, (born 1986), model
Alice Dellal (born 1987), model
Minnie Driver (born 1970), actress
Yolande Du Bois (1900–1961), teacher and activist
Peter Eckersley (1892–1963), broadcasting engineer, and Chief Engineer, BBC, 1923–1929
Thomas Eckersley (1886–1959), theoretical physicist and electrical engineer
Alice Eve (born 1982), actress
Johnny Flynn, (born 1983), folk musician (with his band The Sussex Wit) and actor
Alys Fowler (born 1978), author and gardener, former Gardener's World presenter
Charis Frankenburg (1892–1985), educationalist and psychologist
Margaret Gardiner (1904–2005), art collector and philanthropist
Rolf Gardiner (1902–1971), ecological campaigner and youth leader
Fiona Godlee (born 1961), physician and editor
Tabitha Goldstaub (born 1985), co-founder of CognitionX 
Michael J. C. Gordon (born 1948), computer scientist
Lady Naomi Gordon-Lennox (born 1962), actress (known as Nimmy March)
Tomás Graves (born 1953), son of Robert Graves, writer, musician and designer
Barbara Greg (1900–1983), artist
Battiscombe Gunn (1883–1950), Professor of Egyptology, University of Oxford, 1934–1950
Allan Gwynne-Jones (1892–1982), painter
Marika Hackman (born 1991), singer, songwriter
Christopher Hall (born 1957), producer
Peter Hall, (born 1960), London-based Australian financier and animal welfare philanthropist
John Pennington Harman (1914–1944), World War II Victoria Cross recipient
Rebecca Harris (born 1967), Conservative MP for Castle Point since 2010
Vivian Beynon Harris (1906–1987), English writer
Douglas Hartree (1897–1958), academic
Robin Hill (1899–1991), plant biochemist
Judith Herrin (born 1942), archaeologist, author, scholar of Byzantium
Ivon Hitchens (1893–1979), painter
John Hitchens (born 1940), painter
Frieda Hughes (born 1960), poet and artist
Edward Impey (born 1962), British historian, archaeologist, and museum curator
Lara Johnson-Wheeler (born 1993), arts and fashion journalist, daughter of UK Prime Minister Boris Johnson
Anna Keay, (born 1974), architectural historian, author, television personality and Director of The Landmark Trust
Michael Kidner (born 1917–2009), op artist
John Layard (1891–1974), anthropologist and psychologist
Richard Leacock (born 1921), documentary film director
Lydia Leonard (born 1981), actress
Alan Jay Lerner (1918–1986), lyricist
Richard Livsey, Baron Livsey of Talgarth (1935–2010), politician
Roger Lloyd-Pack (1944–2014), actor ("Trigger" in Only Fools and Horses)
Tom Lodge (1936–2012), author and radio broadcaster
Geoffrey Lupton, (1882-1949), Arts and Crafts
Ella Marchment, (born 1992), Opera and Theatre Director
Malcolm MacDonald (1901–1981), politician
Marne Maitland (1914-1992), actor
Joan Malleson (1899–1956), physician
Jane Mayer (born 1955), American journalist and writer (attended Bedales as exchange student, 1972–73)
Mary Medd (née Crowley) (1907–2005), architect
Charlie Muirhead (born 1975), British Internet entrepreneur, currently co-founder and CEO of CognitionX
Nina Murdoch (born 1970), painter
Edward Murphy (born 1921), first-class cricketer, son of J. T. Murphy
Paul Nizan (born 1905), philosopher
Roxanna Panufnik (born 1968), composer
Bas Pease (1922–2004), physicist
Gervase de Peyer (1926–2017), clarinetist
Barnaby Phillips, Al-Jazeera (born 1968), correspondent
Ben Polak, (born 1961), Provost of Yale University
Roger Powell (1896–1990), bookbinder
Frances Partridge (1900–2004), writer and diarist
Luke Pritchard, lead singer of The Kooks
Lettice Ramsey (1898–1985), psychologist and photographer (Ramsey and Muspratt, Cambridge)
 Sarah Raphael (1960–2001), painter
 Jacques Raverat, (1885-1925) painter
 Dorothy Rayner (1912–2003), palaeontologist and academic geologist
 Sir Frank Roberts (1907–1998), politician
 Eric M. Rogers (1902–1990), physicist
 Lucinda Rogers (born 1966), artist
 Sir John Rothenstein (1901–1992), art historian, and Director, Tate Gallery, 1938–1964
 Teresa Rothschild (1915–1996), counter-intelligence officer and magistrate
 Raphael Salaman (1906–1993), engineer and tool collector
 Samuel Isidore Salmon (1900–1980), chairman of J. Lyons and Co., member of Members of the Greater London Council
George Sanders (1906–1972), actor, winner of the Academy Award for Best Supporting Actor 1950 for All About Eve
Sir Selwyn Selwyn-Clarke (1893–1976), Director of Medical Services, Hong Kong and Governor of the Seychelles
Mary Ann Sieghart, (born 1961), journalist and radio presenter
Wilfred Talbot Smith (born Frank Wenham; 8 June 1885 – 27 April 1957), English occultist and ceremonial magician
Arthur Snell, (born 1975), British High Commissioner to Trinidad and Tobago
Alix Strachey (1892–1973), translator of Sigmund Freud's works
Zoe Strimpel, (born 1982), journalist, writer and historian
Kate Summerscale (born 1965), author
Juno Temple (born 1989), actress
Natalia Tena (born 1984), actress and musician
Teddy Thompson (born 1976), singer/songwriter and musician
Ceawlin Thynn, 8th Marquess of Bath (born 1974)
Julian Trevelyan (1910–1988), painter and printmaker
William Topley (born 1964), musician
Ethlie Ann Vare (born 1953), writer and journalist
John Vincent (1937–2021), historian
Valentine Warner (born 1972), chef and presenter
E. L. Grant Watson (1885–1970), writer and scientist
Camilla Wedgwood (1901–1955), anthropologist
Josiah Wedgwood V (1899–1968), managing director, Wedgwoods, 1930–1961
Gabriel Weston (born 1970), surgeon and author
Lancelot Law Whyte (1896–1972), physicist, engineer, entrepreneur
Patrick Wolf (born 1983), singer/songwriter
Sir Peter Wright, (born 1926), ballet dancer and director
John Wyndham (1903–1969), novelist
Konni Zilliacus (1894–1967), writer and politician
Marijne van der Vlugt (born 1965), musician and TV presenter

Footnotes

References
See also Bibliography for John Haden Badley.

A quoit tient la superiorité des Anglo-Saxons? Edmond Demolins
Bedales School; A School for Boys. Outline of its aims and system J H Badley; Cambridge University Press, 1892
Notes and suggestions for Those who Join the staff at Bedales School J H Badley; Cambridge University Press, 1922.
Bedales: A Pioneer School J H Badley; Methuen, 1923
Bedales Since the War Geoffrey Crump; Chapman and Hall, 1936
English Progressive Schools Robert Skidelsky; Penguin, 1969
John Haden Badley 1865–1967 Gyles Brandreth & Sally Henry; Bedales Society, 1967
Irregularly Bold: A Study of Bedales School James Henderson; Andree Deutsch, 1978. 
The Public School Phenomenon Jonathan Gathorne-Hardy; Hodder & Stoughton, London, 1977
Bedales 1935–1965 Memories and Reflections of Fifteen Bedalians HB Jacks; The Bedales Society, 1978
Bedales School – The First Hundred Years Roy Wake, Pennie Denton. Haggerston Press, London, 1993

External links
 Bedales School
 Profile on UK Boarding Schools
 Profile at the Good Schools Guide

Educational institutions established in 1893
Co-educational boarding schools
Grade I listed buildings in Hampshire
Private schools in Hampshire
Member schools of the Headmasters' and Headmistresses' Conference

Petersfield
1893 establishments in England
Boarding schools in Hampshire